Billable Hours is a Canadian comedy series that was aired on Showcase from 2006 to 2008. Set in the fictional Toronto law firm of Fagen & Harrison, the series focuses on three young lawyers struggling to balance their expectations of life with the difficult realities of building a career in the driven Bay Street corporate environment, and engaging in immature and unprofessional behaviour to cope with the soul-crushing drudgery of working life.

The series was created by Adam Till, a former lawyer who quit law after becoming disillusioned with the corporate environment, and actor Fabrizio Filippo.

Production
The first season was filmed in a real Bay Street office building, in offices recently vacated by a real law firm. The space was taken over by another company by the time the second season went into production, however, and with no suitable new office space available Temple Street was forced to build a new office set in its own studios.

Broadcast
The series debuted on Showcase in 2006, and was produced by Temple Street Productions. Its first episode received what was at the time the channel's highest ratings for an original series premiere. The second season premiered in April 2007, and was accompanied by a 10-part webisode series entitled Billable Minutes.  The third season of the show premiered in October 2008.

The series ended on December 3, 2008. The series also received a second-window broadcast on the terrestrial Global television network.

In Australia, the series premiered on ABC2 in August 2009, with all three seasons airing as one continuous run.

Awards
At the 23rd Gemini Awards in 2008, the series received nominations for Best Ensemble Performance in a Comedy Program or Series for the episode "Monopoly Man", and Best Writing in a Comedy or Variety Program or Series for the episode "One Hit Wonder". At the 24th Gemini Awards in 2009, the series won the awards for Best Writing in a Comedy or Variety Program or Series for the episode "A Manson for All Seasons", and Best Sound in a Comedy, Variety, or Performing Arts Program or Series for the episode "Pigeon Lawyer".

Cast
 Brandon Firla as Clark Claxton III
 Fabrizio Filippo as Sam Caponelli
 Jennifer Baxter as Robin Howland
 Dov Tiefenbach as Stu Berger
 Jane Luk as Cam Belter, office manager
 Aron Tager as Mortie Fagen, head partner
 Ennis Esmer as Zoltan
 Mike Beaver as Murray Stipple
 Ron Gabriel as Seth Kaplin, managing partner
 Jayne Eastwood as Maxine Bingly
 Robin Brûlé as Millie Larkin, Clark's assistant
 Arnold Pinnock as Vic Laghm

Episodes

Season 1 (2006)

Season 2 (2007)

Season 3 (2008)

Notes
 In the opening of the episode 201, "Birthday Suits", a lawyer attempts to demonstrate the strength of the office building windows by throwing himself against one of them, but the window shatters and he falls to his death. Such an incident actually took place in a Toronto law firm in 1993. The plot device of falling through a shattered skyscraper window also figures prominently in the Canadian film waydowntown, starring series co-creator Fab Filippo.
 In episode 203, "15 Minutes of Shame", it is discovered that Robin played a zombie in a low-rent horror movie.  This was a joke referencing Jennifer Baxter's 2005 appearance as a zombie in George Romero's Land of the Dead.

References

External links
 
 

2006 Canadian television series debuts
2008 Canadian television series endings
2000s Canadian sitcoms
2000s Canadian workplace comedy television series
Canadian legal television series
Showcase (Canadian TV channel) original programming
Television shows filmed in Toronto
Television shows set in Toronto
Television series by Temple Street Productions